The Super Powers Team: Galactic Guardians is an American animated television series about a team of superheroes which ran from 1985 to 1986. It was produced by Hanna-Barbera Productions and is based on the Justice League and associated comic book characters published by DC Comics.

Summary
In the fall of 1985, the final version of Hanna-Barbera's Super Friends premiered. The Justice League of America (now called the Super Powers Team, to tie-in with the Super Powers Collection toyline then being produced by Kenner) were once again headquartered at the Hall of Justice (which had been redesigned for this series to appear more pentagon-like and seemingly larger) in Metropolis, and battled such familiar foes as Darkseid, Lex Luthor and Scarecrow.

Amidst those changes, another change in the series was the absence of a narrator in every episode. In the original series from 1973, Ted Knight was the program's narrator. William Woodson became the narrator beginning with 1977's All-New Super Friends Hour. Woodson would remain the voice of the series through the final episode of 1984's SuperFriends: The Legendary Super Powers Show. Adam West, star of the 1960s live-action Batman series, replaced Olan Soule as the voice actor for Batman. Starting with this incarnation, there was no narration for the majority of the episodes. There is a very brief voice-over by Woodson at the start of the episode, "The Bizarro Super Powers Team", telling us about Bizarro World, but isn't heard afterward. Furthermore, the majority of the original recurring characters of the series were eliminated outside of Samurai and El Dorado while the DC Comics teenage superheroes, Firestorm and Cyborg, wholly replaced the Wonder Twins for the purposes of target audience identification figures. The animation was also improved; most notably Superman, Batman and Wonder Woman looked more like their DC Comics versions, since the style guide illustrated by José Luis García-López in 1982 was heavily used for this series.

The story lines in many of the 1985 episodes were also a bit more dramatic compared to previous installments. The only episodes that featured the old Super Friends style and charm were "The Bizarro Super Powers Team" and "The Case of the Stolen Powers". Except where noted as a short, each episode was 30 minutes long. The show lasted only one season on ABC, marking the end of Hanna-Barbera's 12-year run of the Super Friends.

Characters

The Super Powers Team aka The Justice League

In the episode titled "The Fear", Batman's origin is told for the first time outside of the actual comics. In a flashback, it shows Thomas and Martha Wayne being confronted by an unidentified mugger, just after watching a Robin Hood movie with their small son Bruce. When Thomas ends up trying to fight the mugger, Bruce quotes "No Dad, he's got a..." and lightning is shown in the sky as his parents are shot. The episode was written by Alan Burnett, later a story editor on Batman: The Animated Series. This was also a lengthy appearance of Bruce Wayne and Dick Grayson outside their respective Batman and Robin personas.

This series also marked the first ever appearance of Cyborg in an animated television series. Cyborg's origin was told via a medical journal read by Dr. Martin Stein saying Cyborg was a promising decathlon athlete until an accident destroyed most of his body and his father replaced part of his body with machine parts. Also, he is not a Titan. He becomes fast friends with teammate Firestorm. He is an affiliate of the Justice League of America under Superman. In the introductory episode to Cyborg, "The Seeds of Doom", Cyborg's abilities save Earth from Darkseid's seeds, but as Superman warns, makes Darkseid a dangerous enemy to Cyborg, so Cyborg joins the League.

The Flash appeared only in "The Death of Superman" episode #7, and never used his powers. El Dorado, even if he was not part of the official roster, also made a cameo in "The Death of Superman", and never used his powers or even spoke any lines. Also "The Death of Superman", the Fortress of Solitude more closely resembles the pre-Crisis comic-book version, including a giant yellow key whose use required the combined efforts of Green Lantern, Wonder Woman and Cyborg. This was the first time Wonder Woman's red boots were animated with white stripes since the cancellation of Lynda Carter's live action television series on CBS six years earlier.

New Gods of Apokolips villains
 Darkseid – Following on from the previous season, Darkseid still had two goals: conquer Earth, and marry Wonder Woman; despite his power, the Super Powers Team managed to best him time and again. He was voiced by Frank Welker, using the same deep, growling voice he used for Dr. Claw in Inspector Gadget and (with heavy electronic modulation) Soundwave in The Transformers.
 Desaad
 Kalibak 
 The Parademons – When Darkseid became a recurring villain with this series, the Parademons followed (although the use of the word "demon" on television was often protested by parents' groups). Thus Darkseid's minions were always referred to as "para-drones", despite not looking remotely robotic. Their vocalizations are provided by Frank Welker.

Boom tubes were used here, but referred to as "Star Gates," and they are used by the natives of Apokolips, though without the sonic boom caused by boom tubes; these were carried over from the previous season. New Genesis was never shown or mentioned.

Individual villains
 Lex Luthor – Lex Luthor only appeared briefly at the beginning of "The Seeds of Doom". 
 The Joker – The Joker made his only appearance on the entire Super Friends saga in the episode "The Wild Cards". He wasn't included on the original Legion of Doom because he was already used in Filmation's "The New Adventures of Batman" cartoon of the late 1970s.
 The Royal Flush Gang – The Royal Flush Gang is seen in the episode "The Wild Cards". They are a quartet of thieves recruited by the mysterious Ace (here not an android). Ace is revealed to not only be in league with Darkseid, but also to be The Joker in disguise, as deduced by Batman upon realizing that the Joker's house of cards was missing his namesake card. By the end of the episode, Ten (who feels in over her head) switches sides and the rest of the gang and the Joker are captured.
 Scarecrow – The Scarecrow appears in the episode "The Fear". Along with Professor Jonathan Crane, Commissioner James Gordon is trying to find and arrest The Scarecrow. Batman (at first) and Gordon are both unaware that Crane is the Scarecrow and is secretly sabotaging their investigations. Also in "The Fear", Wonder Woman suggests using the magic lasso to get a confession out of one of Scarecrow's victims, though Professor Jonathan Crane (out of costume) warns her against it for fear of trauma. Batman ultimately identifies Crane as Scarecrow because Crane sent out his pet crow with a fake message for Batman "from the Scarecrow", and the crow's glance was fixed on Crane.
 Brainiac – The mechanical version of Brainiac appeared in an episode called "Brain Child".
 Felix Faust – Felix Faust appears in the episode "The Case of the Stolen Powers". He was shown in a prison with the Penguin as his cellmate. Faust was about to cast a spell to escape by transferring Superman's powers into himself, but Penguin seized the opportunity, stole the Superman powers, and broke out easily, leaving Faust behind. Faust later stripped Penguin of Superman's powers, and gained them himself after he had his spirits apprehend Penguin. He also proved vulnerable to Kryptonite when Firestorm changed his headwear into it. Wonder Woman used her magic lasso to force Felix Faust into relinquishing Superman's powers. The two were again jailed in the same cell much to the dismay of both.
 The Penguin 
 Mister Mxyzptlk – In this series, Mxyzptlk's name is pronounced as Miks-ill-plik (backwards, Kilp-ill-skim) and he takes to tormenting all the members of the team, even when Superman is absent. 
 Bizarro
 Mister Kltpzyxm (Mister Mxyzptlk Bizarro) – In the episode titled "The Bizarro Super Powers Team" Mister Kltpzyxm, a Bizarro Mxyzptlk is created, who promptly speeds off to turn Bizarro world into a beautiful planet like Earth, much to Bizarro's horror.
 Bizarra (Bizarro Wonder Woman) – In the episode titled "The Bizarro Super Powers Team", Bizarro decides that his world of Bizarros needs more heroes than just Bizarro Supermen. He takes a duplicator ray to Earth and makes Bizarro duplicates of Wonder Woman, Firestorm, and Cyborg. Planning on taking them back to protect Bizarro World, Mister Mxyzptlk convinces Bizarro to train his new friends on Earth, which causes havoc for the real Super Powers Team. In the episode, Bizarra is called Bizarro Wonder Woman and is voiced by actress B.J. Ward, who also voiced Wonder Woman.
 Cyzarro (Cyborg Bizarro)
 Firezarro (Firestorm Bizarro)

Both The Joker and The Penguin made their first (and only) Super Friends appearances in two different episodes. While Batman and Robin appeared in Joker's debut episode, they were not present in Penguin's.

Episodes

Cast
 Jack Angel – Flash / Barry Allen, Hawkman, Samurai
 Rene Auberjonois – DeSaad
 Joe Baker –Bizarro Supermen (in "The Bizarro Super Powers Team"), Warden Johnson (in "The Bizarro Super Powers Team")
 Steve Bulen – Teenager Bruce Wayne (in "The Fear"), Dr. Moko (in "Escape from Space City")
 William Callaway – Aquaman
 Peter Cullen – Felix Faust (in "The Case of the Stolen Powers")
 Danny Dark – Superman, Bizarro #1 (in "The Bizarro Super Powers Team")
 Robert DoQui – Strawman #3 (in "The Fear"), Robotic Cyborg (in "Brainchild")
 Patti Glick – Reporter (in "The Case of the Stolen Powers")
 Arlene Golonka – Sarah Simms (in "The Seeds of Doom"), Queen (in "The Wild Cards")
 Darryl Hickman – Steve Trevor (in "The Darkseid Deception")
 Jerry Houser – Jack (in "The Wild Cards")
 Ernie Hudson – Cyborg, Bizarro-Cyborg (in "The Bizarro Super Powers Team")
 Stan Jones – Lex Luthor (in "The Seeds of Doom"), Reporter (in "The Death of Superman")
 Casey Kasem – Robin
 Paul Kirby – Thomas Wayne (in "The Fear")
 Lucy Lee – Martha Wayne (in "The Fear")
 Sidney Miller – Commissioner Gordon (in "The Fear"), Strawman #4
 Haunani Minn – Princess Aliana (in "The Ghost Ship"), Kiri Moko (in "Escape from Space City")
 Lynne Moody – Ten (in "The Wild Cards")
 Robert Morse – The Penguin (in "The Case of the Stolen Powers")
 Stanley Ralph Ross – Brainiac (in "Brainchild")
 Michael Rye – Green Lantern, Joe Chill (in "The Fear"), Strawman #1 (in "The Fear")
 Ken Sansom – Professor Martin Stein
 Andre Stojka – Scarecrow (in "The Fear"), Alfred Pennyworth (in "The Fear"), Guard #2 (in "The Fear"), Strawman #2 (in "The Fear") 
 Mark L. Taylor – Firestorm, Bizarro-Firestorm (in "The Bizarro Super Powers Team")
 Dick Tufeld – Announcer 
 B.J. Ward – Wonder Woman, Bizarro Wonder Woman (in "The Bizarro Super Powers Team"), Young Bruce Wayne (in "The Fear")
 Frank Welker – Darkseid, Kalibak, The Joker/Ace (in "The Wild Cards"), Mister Mxyzptlk (in "The Bizarro Super Powers Team"), Mister Kltpzyxm (in "The Bizarro Super Powers Team"), Parademons
 Adam West – Batman/Bruce Wayne
 Eugene Williams – King (in "The Wild Cards")
 Bill Woodson – Narrator

Home media
 On October 23, 2007, Warner Home Video (via DC Entertainment, Hanna-Barbera Productions and Warner Bros. Family Entertainment) released the complete series of The Super Powers Team: Galactic Guardians on DVD, containing all 10 episodes of the ninth and final Super Friends series was intended to be unedited and uncut, and presented in its original broadcast presentation and original airdate order, but one episode "The Bizarro Super Powers Team" is missing its title card on the DVD and "Escape From Star City" was the actual final episode (#8), but on the DVD "The Death of Superman" is mistakenly listed as episode #8 on disc 2, despite listed as episode #7 (the true number) on the DVD packaging. The author of The Ultimate Super Friends guide suggests that this should have been the final episode because it starred all the members of The Super Powers Team, despite broadcast as episode #7. In truth, the final episode "Escape From Star City" has the united team of the core founding members for the first and last time as Aquaman appears in an active role in this episode.

In addition, the episodes "The Death of Superman" and "The Seeds of Doom" were included on Warner's 25 Cartoon Collection: DC Comics, released on August 27, 2013.
The episodes "The Seeds of Doom" and "The Death of Superman" were included on disc 2 of Warner's The Best of Superman, released on June 4, 2013.

References

External links
 

1985 American television series debuts
1986 American television series endings
1980s American animated television series
1980s American science fiction television series
American animated television spin-offs
American children's animated space adventure television series
American children's animated science fantasy television series
American children's animated superhero television series
American Broadcasting Company original programming
Animated Batman television series
Animated Justice League television series
Animated Superman television series
Wonder Woman in other media
Super Friends
Television series by Hanna-Barbera
Television series by Warner Bros. Television Studios
Television series set in 1985
Animated television shows based on DC Comics
English-language television shows
Television shows based on Hasbro toys